was the thirty-ninth of the fifty-three stations of the Tōkaidō. It is located in the present-day city of Chiryū in Aichi Prefecture, Japan.

History
Chiryū-juku was noted for a famed Shinto shrine, the Chiryū Daimyōjin, and also for its flourishing horse market, held in late April to early May of each year. Tokugawa Ieyasu ordered that the post station plant pine trees along through route of the highway before and after the town. The classic ukiyo-e print by Andō Hiroshige (Hōeidō edition) from 1831 to 1834 depicts horses, and also one of the pine trees. Hiroshige entitled the work . Despite the construction of railroads following the Meiji restoration the horse market continued into the Shōwa period, and most of the pine trees survived until the 1959 Isewan Typhoon.

Neighboring post towns
Tōkaidō
Okazaki-shuku - Chiryū-juku - Narumi-juku

Further reading
Carey, Patrick. Rediscovering the Old Tokaido:In the Footsteps of Hiroshige. Global Books UK (2000). 
Chiba, Reiko. Hiroshige's Tokaido in Prints and Poetry. Tuttle. (1982) 
Taganau, Jilly. The Tokaido Road: Travelling and Representation in Edo and Meiji Japan. RoutledgeCurzon (2004).

References

Stations of the Tōkaidō
Stations of the Tōkaidō in Aichi Prefecture